The 76 Airlift Division was a division of the United States Air Force, activated on 1 March 1976, inactivated on 30 September 1977, reactivated on 15 December 1980, and then inactivated again on 1 October 1985.  Its principal components were the 89th Military Airlift Wing and the 1776th Air Base Wing.

Operations
The division was formed as a restructuring of Headquarters Command, U.S. Air Force.

From 1976 through 1977, "and after 1980, the 76th provided airlift support for the President, Vice President, cabinet members, and other high ranking civilian and military dignitaries of the United States and other governments. Subordinate units also operated, administered and maintained Andrews Air Force Base, Maryland, and provided logistical support for the National Emergency Airborne Command Post (NEACP), and other flying units. One subordinate component, the 1st Helicopter Squadron, provided support for the United States Department of Defense, and the Defense Preparedness Agency plan for emergency evacuation of key government officials and to support the national search and rescue plan."

Lineage
 Established as the 76 Airlift Division on 17 February 1976
 Activated on 1 March 1976
 Inactivated on 30 September 1977
 Activated on 15 December 1980
 Inactivated on 1 October 1985

Assignments
 Twenty-First Air Force, 1 March 1976–30 September 1977.
 Twenty-First Air Force, 15 December 1980–1 October 1985

Stations
 Andrews Air Force Base, Maryland, 1 March 1976–30 September 1977
 Andrews Air Force Base, Maryland, 15 December 1980–1 October 1985

Aircraft

 Beechcraft C-12 Huron, 1976–1977, 1980–1985
 Boeing C-135 Stratolifter, 1976–1977, 1980–1985
 Sikorsky CH-3, 1976–1977, 1980–1985
 North American T-39 Sabreliner, 1976–1977
 Bell UH-1 Iroquois, 1976–1977, 1980–1985
 Beechcraft VC-6 King Air, 1976–1977
 McDonnell Douglas VC-9 Skytrain II, 1976–1977, 1980–1985
 Convair VC-131, 1976–1977
 Boeing VC-135 Stratolifter, 1976–1977, 1980–1985
 Boeing VC-137 Stratoliner, 1976–1977, 1980–1985
 Lockheed VC-140 JetStar, 1976–1977, 1980–1985
 Beechcraft VC-6 Ute, 1980–1985
 C-20 Gulfstream III, 1983–1985

Commanders

 None (not manned), 1 March 1976–30 June 1976
 Major General William C. Norris, 1 July 1976
 Major General Benjamin F. Starr Jr., 26 July 1977–30 September 1977
 Brigadier General Archer L. Durham, c.15 December 1980
 Brigadier General Albert C. Guidotti, 1 February 1982
 Brigadier General Paul A. Harvey, 22 August 1984–c.1 October 1985

Emblem
Azure, a globe with axis bendwise celeste gridlined light green, surmounted in pale by a silhouetted aircraft ascending silver gray, overall coinciding with the edge of the globe in base, the US Capitol argent garnished of the first, all within a diminished bordure or. (approved c. July 1976)

See also
 List of United States Air Force air divisions

References

Notes

Bibliography

 

Airlift 0076
Military units and formations disestablished in 1985